This is a list of French television related events from 2004.

Events
13 May - Steeve Estatof wins the second series of Nouvelle Star.
7 October - Documentary The Staircase (Soupçons) is premiered in miniseries format on Canal+.
22 December - Grégory Lemarchal wins the fourth series of Star Academy, becoming the show's first man to be crowned as winner.

Debuts
6 August – Atomic Betty
30 August - Plus belle la vie (2004–present)
Eurasia : À la conquête de l'Orient (2004–2004)

Television shows

1940s
Le Jour du Seigneur (1949–present)

1950s
Présence protestante (1955-)

1970s
30 millions d'amis (1976–2016)

1990s
Sous le soleil (1996–2008)

2000s
Star Academy (2001–2008, 2012–2013)
Nouvelle Star (2003–2010, 2012–present)

Ending this year

Deaths

See also
2004 in France

References